Beyren-lès-Sierck is a commune in the Moselle department in Grand Est in northeastern France.

The locality of Gandren (German: Gandern) is incorporated in the commune since 1812.

Population

See also
 Communes of the Moselle department

References

External links
 

Communes of Moselle (department)